Jordan Martel (born 11 June 1996) is a Guernsey cricketer. He was named in Guernsey's squad for the 2015 ICC World Cricket League Division Six tournament in England. In May 2019, he was named in Guernsey's squad for the 2019 T20 Inter-Insular Cup. The same month, he was named in Guernsey's squad for the Regional Finals of the 2018–19 ICC T20 World Cup Europe Qualifier tournament in Guernsey. He made his Twenty20 International (T20I) debut for Guernsey, against Denmark, on 18 June 2019.

References

External links
 

1996 births
Living people
Guernsey cricketers
Guernsey Twenty20 International cricketers
Place of birth missing (living people)